Pauline Johanna Gesine Mouthaan  (1892-?) was a Dutch artist.

Biography 
Mouthaan was born on 29 January 1892 in Vrijenban.
Mouthaan studied at the Rijksakademie van beeldende kunsten (State Academy of Fine Arts). In 1918, she was the recipient of the Cohen Godschalk Prize. Her work was included in the 1939 exhibition and sale Onze Kunst van Heden (Our Art of Today) at the Rijksmuseum in Amsterdam. 
Mouthaan was a member of the Arti et Amicitiae and the Pulchri Studio.

The date of her death is unknown.

References

1892 births
Year of death missing
People from South Holland
20th-century Dutch women artists